The Enterprise-Tocsin is a newspaper in the U.S. state of Mississippi. The newspaper offices are in Indianola. The newspaper is distributed in Sunflower County and sections of northern Humphreys County. It is published weekly, on each Thursday.

References

External links

 The Enterprise-Tocsin

Newspapers published in Mississippi
Sunflower County, Mississippi